UNESCO's City of Literature programme is part of the wider Creative Cities Network.

The Network was launched in 2004, and now has member cities in seven creative fields.  The other creative fields are: Crafts and Folk Art, Design, Film, Gastronomy, Media Arts, and Music.

Criteria for Cities of Literature
To be approved as a City of Literature, cities need to meet a number of criteria set by UNESCO.

Designated UNESCO Cities of Literature share similar characteristics:
 Quality, quantity, and diversity of publishing in the city
 Quality and quantity of educational programmes focusing on domestic or foreign literature at primary, secondary, and tertiary levels
 Literature, drama, and/or poetry playing an important role in the city
 Hosting literary events and festivals, which promote domestic and foreign literature
 Existence of libraries, bookstores, and public or private cultural centres, which preserve, promote, and disseminate domestic and foreign literature
 Involvement by the publishing sector in translating literary works from diverse national languages and foreign literature
 Active involvement of traditional and new media in promoting literature and strengthening the market for literary products

Cities submit bids to UNESCO to be designated a City of Literature.  The designations are monitored and reviewed every four years by UNESCO.

About the cities

In 2004, Edinburgh became the first literary city.  It hosts the annual International Book Festival and has its own poet laureate—the Makar.

Ljubljana runs their Library Under the Treetops at various locations across the city, including Tivoli City Park and Zvezda Park.  These sites offer a selection of book genres and several domestic and foreign newspapers and magazines.

Manchester is home to the "world-class" Central Library and the "historic gems" of The Portico, John Rylands, and Chetham's.

Melbourne's "vibrant literary scene" includes over 300 bookshops, Victoria State Library among many other libraries, a base for Penguin Random House and for Lonely Planet, the Wheeler Centre, and the Melbourne Writers' Festival.

Prague's "great intellectual and creative resources," includes the book design, illustration, typography, and graphic design fields.  It also has the National Library of the Czech Republic among over 200 libraries, one of Europe's highest concentrations of bookshops, and the Prague Writers' Festival.

Libraries in other literary cities, include: Braidense National Library in Milan, Heidelberg University Library, and the National Library of Ireland in Dublin.

Dunedin is the "Edinburgh of the South", and home to New Zealand's oldest university. Durban is "fun-loving."

Montevideo is a "vibrant, eclectic place" and Québec City is a "gorgeous, seductive place."

Cities of Literature

There are forty two Cities of Literature, spanning twenty-eight countries and six continents.

Twenty-four of the represented cities are European, seven are Asian, and three are North American. Oceania and South America is represented by two cities each, while Africa is to have one designated city.

Eight countries have two designated cities, while the UK has five.

The Cities of Literature are:

See also
Creative Cities Network
City of Crafts and Folk Arts
City of Music
City of Film
Design Cities
City of Gastronomy

References

External links

 Creative Cities Map, UNESCO.
 Edinburgh City of Literature
 Melbourne City of Literature
 Iowa City City of Literature
 Dublin City of Literature
 Reykjavík City of Literature
 Writers' Centre Norwich
 Kraków City of Literature
 Heidelberg City of Literature
 Dunedin City of Literature
 Granada City of Literature
 Prague City of Literature
 Barcelona City of Literature
 Lillehammer City of Literature
 Ljubljana City of Literature
 Lviv City of Literature
 Nottingham City of Literature
 Óbidos Vila Literária
 Seattle City of Literature
 Tartu City of Literature
 Ulyanovsk City of Literature
 Utrecht City of Literature
 Bucheon City of Literature
 Exeter City of Literature

Literature lists
Lists of cities
UNESCO